A referendum on the length of the term of Parliament was held on 27 October 1990. Voters were asked whether they approved of extending the term of office from three years to four. The change was rejected by 69.3% of voters, with a turnout of 82.4%.

Results

See also
1967 New Zealand parliamentary term referendum

References

1990 referendums
Parliamentary term referendum
Parliamentary term referendum
Referendums in New Zealand